Transport for Greater Manchester (TfGM) is a local government body responsible for co-ordinating transport services throughout Greater Manchester in North West England. It is an executive arm of the Greater Manchester Combined Authority (GMCA), the city region's administrative authority. The strategies and policies of Transport for Greater Manchester are set by the GMCA and its Greater Manchester Transport Committee (GMTC). The committee is made up of 33 councillors appointed from the ten Greater Manchester boroughs (Bolton, Bury, Manchester, Oldham, Rochdale, Salford, Stockport, Tameside, Trafford and Wigan), as well as the Mayor of Greater Manchester.

TfGM owns Metrolink – the United Kingdom’s largest light rail network  – which is operated and maintained under contract by a Keolis/Amey consortium. TfGM also owns Greater Manchester's Cycle Hire scheme, and is responsible for cycling and walking infrastructure. TfGM owns and maintains bus stations, stops & shelters, however bus services are deregulated in Great Britain outside London. Following the passing of the Bus Services Act 2017, Greater Manchester became the first city-region to start the process of bus franchising, returning bus services to public control. TfGM does not control National Rail services or infrastructure in Greater Manchester.

TfGM is responsible for developing the Bee Network, an integrated transport network for Greater Manchester. The Bee Network is proposed to include a single transport livery, integrated fares & ticketing, and a fare cap across tram, bus, cycling, walking, and eventually suburban rail. By 2025, Metrolink trams, franchised buses services, and cycle hire are planned to be integrated. Negotiations with central government are ongoing for some commuter rail services to join the network, starting from 2025.

History
The organisation traces its origins to the Transport Act 1968, when the SELNEC (South East Lancashire/North East Cheshire) Passenger Transport Executive was established to co-ordinate public transport in and around Manchester. Between 1974 and 2011, it was known as the Greater Manchester Passenger Transport Executive (GMPTE), until a reform of local government in Greater Manchester granted it more powers and prompted a corporate rebranding. On 1 April 2011, the GMPTE became Transport for Greater Manchester (TfGM), a new regional transport body for Greater Manchester that forms part of the new Greater Manchester Combined Authority (GMCA).

Governance
TfGM inherited the responsibilities of the Greater Manchester Passenger Transport Executive established in 1974.
As a result, GMITA was abolished, replaced by the Transport for Greater Manchester Committee (TfGMC) which ultimately reports to the Combined Authority. TfGMC and its subcommittees are made up of a nominated pool of 33 councillors from the ten metropolitan boroughs of Greater Manchester who manage TfGM and create transport policy in Greater Manchester.

Although it differs in certain structural forms, on the day of its inauguration TfGM became the second most powerful and influential transport organisation in England after Transport for London because it unites previously splintered governance over transport policy in the boroughs under one body. It elects its own Chair and Vice-Chair and assumes the functions previously performed by GMITA as well as the newly devolved transport powers and responsibilities from government and the ten metropolitan councils which make up the area. The 33 councillors have voting rights on most transport issues despite not being members of the GMCA: major decisions still require approval by the GMCA, but the functions that are referred (but not delegated) to the TfGMC include making recommendations in relation to:
The budget and transport levy
Borrowing limit
Major and strategic transport policies
The local transport plan
Operation of Greater Manchester Transport Fund and approval of new schemes
Appointment of Director General/Chief Executive of TfGM

Services

Manchester Metrolink
The Manchester Metrolink light rail system launched in 1992. Entirely subsidised by TfGM without a government grant and operated by KeolisAmey.<ref>RATP buys Manchester Metrolink operator Railway Gazette International 2 August 2011</ref> It carries over 43.7 million passengers a year. With 99 stations it is the second largest local transport network in the United Kingdom after the London Underground. Further expansion to Stockport is envisaged.
Altrincham-Bury line
Altrincham-Piccadilly line
Bury-Piccadilly line
East Didsbury-Rochdale line
Eccles- Ashton line
Manchester Airport-Victoria line
MediaCity- Ashton line
Crumpsall -Trafford Park Line

Rail services
Rail services are operated by Avanti West Coast, CrossCountry, East Midlands Railway, Northern, TransPennine Express and Transport for Wales. TfGM subsidise fares on certain local services and fund station refurbishments on an ad hoc basis.

Buses
Free Bus and Metroshuttle: launched 2002, free bus service around Manchester city centre. New services were provided in Bolton, Oldham and Stockport after success of the service in Manchester.
Bus services operated by private operators including Arriva North West, Bullocks Coaches, D&G Bus, Diamond Bus North West, First Greater Manchester, First West Yorkshire, Go North West, Rosso, Stagecoach Manchester & Vision Bus
Maintenance of bus shelters and stations including Shudehill Interchange
Ring & Ride – An accessible, low-cost minibus service for people who have difficulty in using public transport

Highways and cycling
Greater Manchester Urban Traffic Control Unit (GMUTC) – responsibility for road management transferred to TfGM in 2009. Entails installation, maintenance and management of traffic signals, limited areas of road safety (2012), incident response and event management via a traffic control centre.
Cycling – promotion of the Greater Manchester Cycling Strategy and delivery of Cycle Hubs and regional cycle routes

Fares, ticketing and information
Subsidised fares on certain services
System One travelcards
Get me there
Public transport maps and timetables
Website
Route Explorer application

 

Bee Network

The Bee Network is a proposed integrated transport network for Greater Manchester, composed of bus, tram, cycling, and walking routes. TfGM's vision is for the network to be operational by 2024, with commuter rail services joining the network by 2030.

Originally devised in 2018 as a network of active travel routes, the vision for the Bee Network was expanded following the Greater Manchester Combined Authority's decision to use the powers given to it under the Bus Services Act 2017 to introduce a bus franchising scheme for the city region. The active travel subset of the Bee Network was then renamed the Bee Active Network''.

Corporate identity

TfGM uses a corporate identity designed in-house. The black and white "M" logo is adapted from the GMPTE logo and is used on bus stops across Greater Manchester.

See also

Timeline of public passenger transport operations in Manchester

References

External links

Official website of Transport for Greater Manchester
Greater Manchester Integrated Transport Authority
Greater Manchester Transportation Unit
SELNEC plans for urban rapid transport
Greater Manchester Congestion Charge Proposals
The SELNEC Preservation Society

Organisations based in Manchester
Public transport executives in the United Kingdom
Transport in Greater Manchester
2011 establishments in England